Sacred Heart Cathedral is a Roman Catholic cathedral in Bathurst, New Brunswick, Canada. 

The parish was founded in 1881. It became a cathedral in 1938 when the Diocese of Chatham was moved to Bathurst.

References

External links  
Diocese of Bathurst

Roman Catholic cathedrals in New Brunswick
Roman Catholic churches in New Brunswick
Buildings and structures in Bathurst, New Brunswick